The Filmfare Best Actress Award is given by the Filmfare magazine as part of its annual Filmfare Awards South for Telugu films. The awards were extended to "Best Actress" in 1972. The year indicates the year of release of the film.

Superlatives 

 Vijayashanti has maximum awards with six wins.
 Vanisri won the award the most times in the 70's with three wins. Vijayashanti won the most in the 80s and 90s with three wins each decade. In the 90s, Soundarya had three wins. Trisha won the award three times in 2000s, while Anushka Shetty has the most wins in 2010s with three.
 Jayasudha and Tabu  are the two actress who have won both Filmfare Award for Best Actress – Telugu and Filmfare Award for Best Supporting Actress – Telugu.
 Six actresses have won the awards in consecutive years: Vanisri (1973–1975), Jayasudha (1976–1977), Vijayashanti (1989–1990), Soundarya (1998–1999), Trisha (2004–2005) and Anushka Shetty (2009–2010). Vanisri is the only actress to win the award three times consecutively.
 Jayalalithaa, Revathi and Samantha Akkineni are the only actresses to win both Filmfare Award for Best Actress – Tamil and Filmfare Award for Best Actress – Telugu in the same year for their performances in the year 1972, 1992 and 2012 respectively.
 Five actresses have won the Filmfare Award for Best Actress – Telugu for their debut Telugu films.  In chronological order, Raadhika (1981), Richa Pallod (2000), Sadha (2002), Asin (2003) and Sai Pallavi (2017).
 Nithya Menon is the first actress to win both the Filmfare Award for Best Actress – Telugu (in 2013) and the Filmfare Critics Award for Best Actress (in 2015).
 Sai Pallavi was the first actress who won both Filmfare Award for Best Actress – Telugu and the Filmfare Critics Award for Best Actress awards in the same year (2022).
 Vijayashanti and Keerthy Suresh both have won Filmfare Award for Best Actress – Telugu and National Film Award for Best Actress for their performances in Kartavyam (1990) and Mahanati (2018) respectively.
 Jayasudha has received the most nominations with ten, followed by Anushka Shetty with nine, Soundarya, Jaya Prada and Vijayashanti each with eight.

 In 1981, the one and only time till date, two actresses were nominated for the same film: Jayasudha and Sridevi for Premabhishekam.

Superlatives 
The following individuals have received two or more Best Actress awards:

The following individuals have received five or more Best Actress nominations:

Winners and nominations

1970s

1980s

1990s

2000s

2010s

References

Notes 
 
 
 

Actress
Film awards for lead actress